Christine Haderthauer (née Cuntze, born 11 November 1962) is a German politician and member of the CSU party. She hold several ministerial positions in Bavaria.

Haderthauer was born in Neumünster.

In October 2007 she was elected Secretary General of the CSU. She was succeeded by Karl-Theodor zu Guttenberg in October 2008, as she became Bavarian State Minister for Labor, Social Affairs, Families and Women.

In 2013 she was appointed head of the Bayerische Staatskanzlei (Bavarian State Chancellery) as well as State Minister for Federal Affairs and Special Tasks.

She had to resign from office on 1 September 2014 because of the model car scandal in Bavaria.

Haderthauer was an MP of the Landtag, the parliament of Bavaria, from 2003 until 2018.

She is married and has one daughter and one son.

References

External links
Christine Haderthauer at the Landtag of Bavaria

1962 births
Living people
Christian Social Union in Bavaria politicians
Ministers of the Bavaria State Government
Members of the Landtag of Bavaria
People from Neumünster
Women members of State Parliaments in Germany
21st-century German women politicians
Women ministers of State Governments in Germany